Cohrs is the name of various persons
Benjamin-Gunnar Cohrs (born 1965), German conductor, scholar, and publicist
Eberhard Cohrs (1921–1999), German comedian
Michael Cohrs (born 1956), American financier
Peter Georg Cohrs, German politician

See also
 Coors (disambiguation)